Bridgewater High School was a government  co-educational comprehensive secondary school located in , a suburb of Hobart, Tasmania, Australia.

Fire, relocation, and subsequent closure
Buildings at the school were involved in a fire on 23 October 2007 causing extensive damage valued at 5 million. Lessons at the site were abandoned and students were initially accommodated at Geilston Bay High School and Claremont College. From the beginning of the 2008 school year, students were taught in temporary arrangements at the adjacent Bridgewater Primary School. Bridgewater Primary students were temporarily accommodated at Green Point Primary School. 

All buildings at Bridgewater High were demolished and a new combined middle school, senior college and vocational education facility was constructed on the original site. The new facility is named Jordan River Learning Federation and includes management oversight of Gagebrook, Herdsmens Cove and East Derwent Primary Schools and a Child and Family Centre.

See also 
 List of schools in Tasmania
 Education in Tasmania

References

External links
 Jordan River Learning Federation

Public high schools in Hobart
Defunct schools in Tasmania
2007 disestablishments in Australia
Educational institutions disestablished in 2007